Line 2 is one of the 12 lines of the Mexico City Metro.

The 2 Line is the second oldest in the network, identified by the color blue and runs from West to East and then North to South, turning at the city center. It starts at the border of the city with Estado de México and ends South of the city.

General information
Line 2 connects with Line 7 at Tacuba, Line 3 at Hidalgo, Line 8 at Bellas Artes, Line 1 at Pino Suárez, Lines 8 and 9 at Chabacano and Line 12 at Ermita. It is linked with the Mexico City Light Rail to Xochimilco at the Tasqueña terminal. It used to be served by NC-82 and some NM-83 trains.

It runs under the following roads: Calzada San Bartolo Naucalpan in the stretch from Cuatro Caminos to Panteones, Calzada México-Tacuba from Panteones to Normal, Av. Ribera de San Cosme, Av. México - Tenochtitlan from Revolución to Hidalgo, Av. Hidalgo from Hidalgo to Bellas Artes, Tacuba street, República de Guatemala street, José María Pino Suárez street from Zócalo/Tenochtitlan to Pino Suárez. From San Antonio Abad it runs at ground level over Calzada San Antonio Abad and Calzada de Tlalpan till the terminus of the line in Tasqueña. With 737,396 passengers per day in 2019, it is the busiest line of the Mexico City Metro.

This line was temporarily served by an NM-02 train printed with landscapes and images of Mexico City.

History
Line 2 opened on August 1, 1970, in the stretch Tasqueña–Pino Suárez. Pino Suárez station became the first transfer station of the Mexico City Metro, connecting with Line 1, built one year before.

On September 14th, the line was expanded towards Tacuba station.

The last expansion of the line occurred in 1984 when two more stations were built: Panteones and Cuatro Caminos, the latter being the first station of the system to serve the State of Mexico. Cuatro Caminos would remain as the only station to serve the suburbs of Mexico City until 1991, when Line A opened and service reached the municipality of Los Reyes La Paz, in the southeastern part of the State of Mexico with the stations Los Reyes and La Paz.

1975 train crash

This line has seen the worst accident in Mexico City history when on October 20, 1975 when there was a crash between two trains at Viaducto metro station. One train was parked at the station picking up passengers when it was hit by another train that did not stop in time. At least 27 people were killed and several wounded. After this accident, automatic traffic lights were installed in all lines.

Chronology
August 1, 1970: from Tasqueña to Pino Suárez.
September 14, 1970: from Pino Suárez to Tacuba.
August 22, 1984: from Tacuba to Cuatro Caminos.

Rolling stock
Line 2 has had different types of rolling stock throughout the years.

Alstom MP-68: : 1970–1975
Concarril NM-73: : 1975–2005
Concarril NM-79:  1980–2006
Alstom MP-82:  1985–2007
Bombardier NC-82:  1987–2005
CAF/Bombardier NM-02: 2004–present

Currently, out of the 390 trains in the Mexico City Metro network, 40 are in service in Line 2.

Station list 

The stations from west to east and from north to south: 
{| class="wikitable" rules="all"
|-
!rowspan="2" | No.
!rowspan="2" | Station
!rowspan="2" | Date opened
!rowspan="2" | Level
!colspan="2" | Distance (km)
!rowspan="2" | Connection
!rowspan="2" colspan="2"|Location
|-
!style="font-size: 65%;"|Betweenstations
!style="font-size: 65%;"|Total
|-
|style="background: #; color: white;"|01
|Cuatro Caminos 
| rowspan="2" |August 22, 1984
| rowspan="12" |Undergroundtrench
|style="text-align:right;"|-
|style="text-align:right;"|0.0
|
 Cuatro Caminos
 Routes: 18, 57-A, 57-C
 Route: 16-B
|Naucalpan
|State of Mexico
|-
|style="background: #; color: white;"|02
|Panteones
|style="text-align:right;"|1.8
|style="text-align:right;"|1.8
|
 Route: 18
 Route: 16-B
|rowspan="6"|Miguel Hidalgo
|style="text-align:center; width:1em;" rowspan="23"|Mexico City
|-
|style="background: #; color: white;"|03
|Tacuba 
| rowspan="11" |September 14, 1970
|style="text-align:right;"|1.6
|style="text-align:right;"|3.4
|
  Line 7
 Tacuba
 Routes: 18, 59, 107
 Routes: 11-A, 16-B, 16-D, 19-H
|-
|style="background: #; color: white;"|04
|Cuitláhuac
|style="text-align:right;"|0.7
|style="text-align:right;"|4.1
|
 Routes: 18, 19, 107, 107-B
  Line 6: Calz.México-Tacuba stop (at distance)
 Routes: 16-B, 16-D
|-
|style="background: #; color: white;"|05
|Popotla
|style="text-align:right;"|0.8
|style="text-align:right;"|4.9
|
 Route: 18
 Routes: 16-B, 16-D
|-
|style="background: #; color: white;"|06
|Colegio Militar
|style="text-align:right;"|0.6
|style="text-align:right;"|5.5
|
 Route: 16-B
|-
|style="background: #; color: white;"|07
|Normal
|style="text-align:right;"|0.7
|style="text-align:right;"|6.2
|
 Routes: 19, 19-A, 200
 Routes: 16-A, 16-B
|-
|style="background: #; color: white;"|08
|San Cosme 
|style="text-align:right;"|0.8
|style="text-align:right;"|7.0
|
 (at distance)
 Route: 59-A
 Routes: 12-B, 12-D, 16-A, 16-B
|rowspan="9"|Cuauhtémoc
|-
|style="background: #; color: white;"|09
|Revolución 
|style="text-align:right;"|0.8
|style="text-align:right;"|7.8
|
 (at distance)
  Line 1: Revolución station (at distance)
  Line 4: México-Tenochtitlan station (at distance)
 Routes: 12-B (at distance), 16-A, 16-B
|-
|style="background: #; color: white;"|10
|Hidalgo 
|style="text-align:right;"|0.7
|style="text-align:right;"|8.5
|
  Line 3
 (at distance)
  Line 3: Hidalgo station
  Line 4: Hidalgo station (north route)
  Line 7: Hidalgo station
 Temporary Line 1 service: Hidalgo stop
 Route: 27-A

  Line 5: Metro Hidalgo stop
 Route: 16-A
|-
|style="background: #; color: white;"|11
|Bellas Artes 
|style="text-align:right;"|0.6
|style="text-align:right;"|9.1
|
  Line 8

<li>  Line 4: Bellas Artes station (north route)
<li>  Line 1: Bellas Artes stop
<li> Route: 16-A
|-
|style="background: #; color: white;"|12
|Allende
|style="text-align:right;"|0.5
|style="text-align:right;"|9.6
|
<li> (at distance)
|-
|style="background: #; color: white;"|13
|Zócalo/Tenochtitlan 
|Undergroundtwo-story trench
|style="text-align:right;"|0.8
|style="text-align:right;"|10.4
|
<li> Passage Zócalo-Pino Suárez
<li>
|-
|style="background: #; color: white;"|14
|Pino Suárez 
| rowspan="2" |August 1, 1970
|Undergroundtrench (Lv. -2)
|style="text-align:right;"|0.9
|style="text-align:right;"|11.3
|
<li>  Line 1 (out of service)
<li> Passage Zócalo-Pino Suárez
<li> Nezahualcóyotl (at distance)
<li>
<li>  Line 4: Pino Suárez station (south route)
<li> Routes: 2-A, 31-B, 111-A, 145-A (also temporary Line1 service)
<li> Routes: 17-C, 17-H, 17-I, 19-E, 19-F, 19-G, 19-H
|-
|style="background: #0055BF; color: white;"|15
|San Antonio Abad 
| rowspan="9" |Ground-level, overground access
|style="text-align:right;"|1.0
|style="text-align:right;"|12.3
|
<li> Routes: 2-A, 31-B, 111-A, 145-A
<li> Routes: 14-A, 17-C, 17-H, 17-I
|-
|style="background: #; color: white;"|16
|Chabacano 
|August 1, 1970
|style="text-align:right;"|0.8
|style="text-align:right;"|13.1
|
<li>  Line 8
<li>  Line 9
<li> Routes: 2-A, 31-B, 33, 111-A, 145-A
<li> Routes: 9-C, 9-E, 14-A, 17-C, 17-H, 17-I
|-
|style="background: #; color: white;"|17
|Viaducto
| rowspan="8" |August 1, 1970
|style="text-align:right;"|0.9
|style="text-align:right;"|14.0
|
<li> Routes: 2-A, 31-B, 111-A, 145-A
<li> Routes: 17-C, 17-H, 17-I
|rowspan="6"|Benito Juárez
|-
|style="background: #; color: white;"|18
|Xola 
|style="text-align:right;"|0.6
|style="text-align:right;"|14.6
|
<li>  Line 2: Xola station (at distance)
<li> Routes: 2-A, 31-B, 111-A, 145-A
<li> Routes: 17-C, 17-H, 17-I
|-
|style="background: #; color: white;"|19
|Villa de Cortés 
|style="text-align:right;"|0.8
|style="text-align:right;"|15.4
|
<li> Routes: 2-A, 31-B, 111-A, 145-A
<li>  Line 9: Villa de Cortés stop
<li> Routes: 17-C, 17-H, 17-I
|-
|style="background: #; color: white;"|20
|Nativitas 
|style="text-align:right;"|0.9
|style="text-align:right;"|16.3
|
<li> Routes: 2-A, 31-B, 111-A, 145-A
<li> Routes: 17-C, 17-H, 17-I
|-
|style="background: #; color: white;"|21
|Portales 
|style="text-align:right;"|1.1
|style="text-align:right;"|17.4
|
<li> Routes: 2-A, 31-B, 111-A, 145-A
<li>  Line 3: Miravalle stop (at distance)<li> Route: 6-A (at distance), 17-C, 17-H, 17-I

|-
|style="background: #; color: white;"|22
|Ermita 
|style="text-align:right;"|0.9
|style="text-align:right;"|18.3
|
<li>  Line 12 (out of service)
<li> Routes: 2-A, 31-B, 52-C, 111-A, 145-A (also temporary Line 12 service)
<li> Routes: 6-A (at distance), 17-C, 17-H, 17-I
|-
|style="background: #; color: white;"|23
|General Anaya 
|style="text-align:right;"|1.0
|style="text-align:right;"|19.3
|
<li> Routes: 2-A, 31-B, 111-A, 116-A, 145-A
<li> Routes: 17-C, 17-H, 17-I
|rowspan="2"|Coyoacán
|-
|style="background: #; color: white;"|24
|Tasqueña 
|Ground-level
|style="text-align:right;"|1.5
|style="text-align:right;"|20.8
|
<li> South Bus Terminal
<li> Tasqueña
<li> Routes: 2-A, 17-F, 31-B, 81-A, 111-A, 143, 145-A
<li>  Line 1: Central del Sur stop (at distance)
<li>  Line 7: Tasqueña stop
<li>  Line 1: Tasqueña station
<li> Routes: 2-A, 2-F, 5-A (at distance), 17-C, 17-H, 17-I
|}

Renamed stations

Ridership
The following table shows each of Line 2 stations total and average daily ridership during 2019.

Tourism

Line 2 passes near several places of interest:
Monumento a la Revolución, a monument commemorating the Mexican Revolution located in Plaza de la República (Republic Square).
Paseo de la Reforma, emblematic avenue of Mexico City.
Alameda Central,  public urban park in downtown Mexico City and oldest public park in the Americas.
Palacio de Bellas Artes, Palace of Fine Arts, cultural center.
Historic center of Mexico City
Plaza de la Constitución, Mexico City's main square.
Metropolitan Cathedral
National Palace, the seat of the federal executive in Mexico.
Templo Mayor, archeological site and museum.

See also 
 List of Mexico City Metro lines

References

Notes 

1970 establishments in Mexico
2
Railway lines opened in 1970